The Mieczysław Połukard Criterium of Polish Speedway League Aces usually referred to as the Criterium of Aces (Kryterium Asów) is an annual speedway event held each year organized by the Polonia Bydgoszcz. The Criterium of Aces held in the Polonia Stadium in Bydgoszcz. It is seen by riders and fans as the official opening of the new season. First staged in 1982, although a similar meeting was held in the 1951 as Criterium of Aces (Criterium Asów).

Podium (1951-1960)

Podium (since 1982)

Notes

External links 
Polonia Bydgoszcz webside

 
Criterium of Aces
Criterium